Unaspis is a genus of armored scale insects in the family Diaspididae. There are at least two described species in Unaspis.

Species
 Unaspis citri (Comstock, 1883) (citrus snow scale)
 Unaspis euonymi (Comstock, 1881) (euonymus scale)

References

Further reading

 
 
 
 

Diaspididae
Sternorrhyncha genera